Lanywa or Lan is a town in the Magway Division in Myanmar on the right (western) bank of the Irrawaddy, just above Seikphyu and Chauk. The town hosts a commercial airport, south-east of town.

Notes

External links
 "Lanywa Map — Satellite Images of Lanywa" Maplandia World Gazetteer

Populated places in Magway Region